Eulima confusa is a species of sea snail, a marine gastropod mollusk in the family Eulimidae. The species is one of a number within the genus Eulima.

Distribution
This marine species occurs in the following locations:

 European waters (ERMS scope)

References

External links
 To World Register of Marine Species

confusa
Gastropods described in 1986